Muhammad Riaz Malik (born 15 May 1959) is a Pakistani politician who has been a member of the National Assembly of Pakistan, since August 2018. Previously he was a member of the National Assembly from 2008 to May 2018.

Early life
He was born on 15 May 1959.

Political career

He was elected to the National Assembly of Pakistan as a candidate of Pakistan Muslim League (N) (PML-N) from Constituency NA-118 (Lahore-I) in 2008 Pakistani general election. He received 55,900 votes and defeated Syed Asif Hashmi, a candidate of Pakistan Peoples Party (PPP).

He was re-elected to the National Assembly as a candidate of PML-N from Constituency NA-118 (Lahore-I) in 2013 Pakistani general election. He received 103,346 votes and defeated Hamid Zaman, a candidate of Pakistan Tehreek-e-Insaf.

He was re-elected to the National Assembly as a candidate of PML-N from Constituency NA-123 (Lahore-I) in 2018 Pakistani general election.

References

Living people
Pakistan Muslim League (N) politicians
Punjabi people
Pakistani MNAs 2013–2018
1959 births
Pakistani MNAs 2008–2013
Pakistani MNAs 2018–2023